The Chalk Garden is a 1964 British-American film directed by Ronald Neame. It stars Deborah Kerr and Hayley Mills and is an adaptation of the 1955 play of the same name by Enid Bagnold.

Plot summary
An elderly woman hires Miss Madrigal, a governess with a mysterious past, to look after her disturbed and spoiled teenage granddaughter Laurel, who has driven away many previous governesses.  Laurel feels intense jealousy and resentment of her beautiful mother, who lives elsewhere with her new husband, and her grandmother has taught her to hate her mother. When Miss Madrigal arrives, Laurel tries to investigate her past and potentially expose her. Miss Madrigal had been convicted of murdering her stepsister 15 years ago and was sentenced to death, but the sentence was commuted and she spent years in prison. Miss Madrigal uses this painful revelation to convince Laurel and her grandmother that she was once like Laurel, and that Laurel should leave her toxic environment to live with her mother, with whom she can grow into a better person. Laurel understands Miss Madrigal's self-sacrifice as an example of love, and follows her advice to live with her mother.

Cast
 Deborah Kerr as Miss Madrigal
 Hayley Mills as Laurel
 John Mills as Maitland
 Edith Evans as Mrs St. Maugham
 Felix Aylmer as Judge McWhirrey
 Elizabeth Sellars as Olivia

Production
Don Hartman acquired the story for Paramount Pictures and took it over when he left Paramount in 1956 to become an independent producer. Shortly before Hartman died in 1958, Paramount halted pre-production. In 1960, producer Ross Hunter said that he had the rights to the play, having "forced the studio to buy it." He worked with a writer to make the script "more commercial."

The film was announced in May 1962 and Joanne Woodward was slated to star with Sandra Dee. Hunter wanted Ingrid Bergman for the film and had originally sought Gladys Cooper for the role of Mrs. St. Maugham in place of Edith Evans.

Reception

Critical reception
In a contemporary review for The New York Times, critic Bosley Crowther wrote: "A great deal of scrupulous cultivation and orderly shaping of the plot have been done ... Ronald Neame, who has directed the picture, and John Michael Hayes, who has written the script, present us with a cozy, compact drama that follows a comfortable, sentimental line. ... There are moments, however, when the sharpness of Miss Bagnold's oblique slant on life cuts through, usually in glints of hidden mischief or in lines of slashing paradox and wit. When these come, the film sparkles briefly beyond the brightness of its Technicolored hues."

Box office
The film grossed $180,000 in its second week at Radio City Music Hall in New York City, which was a record for Memorial Day week, and it become the number-one film in the United States. It earned theatrical rentals of $3.25 million in the U.S. and Canada. Filmink said it "proved again that Mills didn't need the Disney name to bring in the punters."

Awards

References

External links
 
 

1964 films
American drama films
British drama films
American films based on plays
Films directed by Ronald Neame
Films set in Brighton
Universal Pictures films
Films with screenplays by John Michael Hayes
Films produced by Ross Hunter
Films scored by Malcolm Arnold
Films shot at MGM-British Studios
1960s English-language films
1960s American films
1960s British films